Olha is a Ukrainian feminine given name related to Olga. Bearers include:

 Olha Basanska (born 1992), Ukrainian footballer
 Olha Basarab (1889–1924), Ukrainian political activist and alleged spy
 Olha Bibik (born 1990), Ukrainian sprinter
 Olha Bohomolets (born 1966), Ukrainian physician, singer and songwriter
 Olha Bura (1986–2014), Ukrainian activist
 Olha Franko (1896–1987), Ukrainian cookbook author
 Olha Freimut (born 1982), Ukrainian TV presenter, journalist, writer and model
 Olha Kobylianska (1863–1942), Ukrainian writer and feminist
 Olha Kosach (1849–1930), pen name Olena Pchilka, Ukrainian publisher, writer, ethnographer, interpreter and civil activist
 Olha Lyakhova (born 1992), Ukrainian middle-distance runner
 Olha Ovdiychuk (born 1993), Ukrainian footballer
 Olha Rozshchupkina (born 1984), Ukrainian former artistic gymnast
 Olha Saladukha (born 1983), Ukrainian former triple jumper
 Olha Skrypak (born 1990), Ukrainian long-distance runner
 Olha Stefanishyna (born 1985), Ukrainian lawyer and civil servant
 Olha Sumska (born 1966), Ukrainian actress
 Olha Zubaryeva (born 1958), Ukrainian handball player

See also
 Olja, a given name and nickname

Ukrainian feminine given names